Peter Gravesen  (born February 11, 1979) is a Danish former footballer who played as a midfielder. He started his career with Danish Superliga clubs Vejle Boldklub and Herfølge Boldklub, and has played for Fylkir in Iceland and APEP in Cyprus.

He is the younger brother of Thomas Gravesen.

External links
Vejle Boldklub profile
Danish Superliga statistics

1979 births
Living people
Danish men's footballers
Danish expatriate men's footballers
Danish Superliga players
Cypriot First Division players
Association football midfielders
Vejle Boldklub players
Herfølge Boldklub players
Peter Gravesen
Expatriate footballers in Iceland
APEP FC players
Expatriate footballers in Cyprus
Danish expatriate sportspeople in Iceland
Jammerbugt FC players
Association football defenders